Airlift Northwest, a program of the University of Washington School of Medicine and Harborview Medical Center, provides flight transport via helicopter and fixed wing aircraft for patients needing intensive medical care in Washington, Idaho, Montana and Alaska.

History
Airlift Northwest was founded in 1982 after three children perished following a Sitka, Alaska, house fire because there was no way to rapidly transport them to a facility capable of treating their injuries. The University of Washington's Dr. Michael Copass was the driving force behind the service which started with one Seattle-based fixed wing aircraft and a medical crew of one physician and one nurse.  It was the first critical care air ambulance service in the region.

Since 1982, Airlift Northwest has had three incidents:   
One of the organization's helicopters crashed into Puget Sound on September 11, 1995, while en route to Bainbridge Island to pick up a woman in labor.  Two nurses and one pilot were killed in the incident. 
The pilot and sole occupant of an Airlift Northwest helicopter sustained serious injuries in a crash near Granite Falls in 2002.  
In 2005, another Airlift Northwest helicopter crashed into the waters off of Edmonds on the evening of September 28; all occupants (a pilot and two nurses) were killed.

Airlift Northwest crews played key roles in the response to the 2014 Oso mudslide, transporting 5 injured survivors to area hospitals.

Operations
Airlift Northwest operates 24 hours a day, 365 days a year and flies approximately 3,200 patients annually  from eight bases in Washington State (Arlington, Bellingham, Bremerton, Davenport, Olympia, Pasco, Wenatchee, and Yakima) and one in Juneau, Alaska. The non-profit agency is entirely self-funded with a $40 million annual budget. Airlift Northwest estimates that it provides about $7.5 million in uncompensated charity care every year. As of March 2023, Airlift Northwest operates 6 rotor wing aircraft (1 Agusta A109E Power and 5 Airbus H135) and 3 Pilatus PC-12 fixed wing aircraft in Washington, and 2 Learjet45 XR fixed wing aircraft in Alaska.

Crew
Airlift Northwest's pilots and aircraft are supplied trained and maintained by two outside contractors: Air Methods Corporation and Aero Air.  Approximately 70 medical personnel, employees of the University of Washington, provide care aboard flights.  Medical crews are trained in Advanced Cardiac Life Support, Pediatric Advanced Life Support, trauma nursing core course, neonatal resuscitation and Emergency Medical Technician.

References

External links
 
 Fleet at Helis.com

1982 establishments in Washington (state)
Air ambulance services in the United States
Healthcare in Alaska
Healthcare in Idaho
Healthcare in Montana
Healthcare in Washington (state)
Non-profit organizations based in Seattle
Medical and health organizations based in Washington (state)
University of Washington organizations
Emergency services in Washington (state)